Motilal Vora (20 December 1928 – 21 December 2020) was an Indian politician belonging to the Indian National Congress (INC). He served as Chief Minister of Madhya Pradesh (1985–1988; 1989). He was born in Nimbi Jodha, Jodhpur State, British India. He was also Governor of Uttar Pradesh from 1993 to 1996.

Early life 
Vora was born  on 20 December 1928 at Nimbi Jodha in Jodhpur State of British India's Rajputana Agency (present-day Nagaur district, Rajasthan) to a Pushkarna Brahmin family. His parents were Mohanlal Vora and Amba Bai. His forefathers came from Nimbi Jodha, and prior to that from Phalodi. He received his education at Raipur and Kolkata. He had also worked with several newspapers for many years. He married Shanti Devi Vora. The couple have four daughters and two sons. His son Arun Vora is an MLA from Durg (CG), having won three elections as MLA. His brother Govindlal Vora was Veteran Journalist and Chief Editor of Amrit Sandesh. His nephew Rajeev Vora is Secretary of Pragati College of Engineering and Management, Raipur.

State politics 
In 1968, Vora, then, a member of Samajwadi party, became a member of the Municipal Committee of Durg (then part of Madhya Pradesh). In 1970 (approximately), he, with the help of Prabhat Tiwari, was introduced to Pt. Kishorilal Shukla of INC and joined INC. He was elected to the Legislative Assembly (Vidhan Sabha) of Madhya Pradesh in 1972 on an INC ticket. He was elected to Vidhan Sabha again in 1977 and 1980. He was appointed a minister of State in Arjun Singh's Cabinet, and was in-charge of the Higher Education Department. He was elevated to the Cabinet Minister in 1983. He also served as the Deputy Chairman of Madhya Pradesh State Road Transport Corporation during 1981–84.

On 13 March 1985, Vora was appointed Chief Minister of Madhya Pradesh. He resigned from the post of Chief Minister on 13 February 1988, to join the Union Government.

National politics 
On 14 February 1988, Vora became a member of the Rajya Sabha, and assumed the office of Union Minister of Health, Family Welfare and Civil Aviation. He was a cabinet minister in Government of India. He was appointed Governor of Uttar Pradesh on 16 May 1993 and held office until 3 May 1996. Motilal Vora was in 1998–99 Member of the 12th Lok Sabha.

Role in the Indian National Congress 
Vora was very close to High Command of INC, and has supported nomination of Rahul Gandhi as the party's Prime Ministerial candidate. In the 1980s, he served as the President of the Madhya Pradesh Congress Committee, the party's state unit.

Vora held important positions in all the three entities involved in the National Herald Case: the Associated Journals Limited (AJL), the Young Indian and the All India Congress Committee (AICC). He became the chairman and managing director of AJL on 22 March 2002. He served as the AICC treasurer before that. He was a 12% shareholder and a Director of Young Indian.

Death 
Vora died from complications from COVID-19 during the COVID-19 pandemic in India, one day after his 92nd birthday.

References 

|-

|-

|-

|-

|-

|-

1928 births
2020 deaths
Followers of Sathya Sai Baba
Chief Ministers of Madhya Pradesh
Governors of Uttar Pradesh
People from Nagaur
Madhya Pradesh MLAs 1985–1990
Rajya Sabha members from Madhya Pradesh
Rajya Sabha members from Chhattisgarh
India MPs 1998–1999
Lok Sabha members from Chhattisgarh
Chief ministers from Indian National Congress
Civil aviation ministers of India
Indian National Congress politicians from Madhya Pradesh
Deaths from the COVID-19 pandemic in India
People from Rajnandgaon